Gaiseric ( – 25 January 477), also known as Geiseric or Genseric was King of the Vandals and Alans (428–477), ruling a kingdom he established, and was one of the key players in the difficulties faced by the Western Roman Empire during the 5th century. Through his nearly 50 years of rule, he raised a relatively insignificant Germanic tribe to the status of a major Mediterranean power. His most famous exploit, however, was the capture and plundering of Rome in June 455. He also defeated two major efforts by the Romans to overthrow him, the first one by the emperor Majorian in 460 or 461, and another by Basiliscus at the Battle of Cape Bon in 468. After his death in Carthage, Gaiseric was succeeded by his son Huneric.

Early life and accession
Gaiseric was an illegitimate son of King Godigisel and a slave woman. After his father's death in a battle against the Franks during the Crossing of the Rhine, Gaiseric became the second most powerful man among the Vandals, after the new king, his half-brother Gunderic—long before his more formal accession to the kingship. Jordanes described Gaiseric in the following manner:

Gaiseric...was a man of moderate height and lame in consequence of a fall from his horse. He was a man of deep thought and few words, holding luxury in disdain, furious in his anger, greedy for gain, shrewd in winning over the barbarians and skilled in sowing the seeds of dissension to arouse enmity.

After Gunderic's death in 428, Gaiseric became king of the Vandals, continuing the hostilities begun by his brother. To this end, he sought ways of increasing the power and wealth of his people, who then resided in the Roman province of Hispania Baetica in southern Hispania. The Vandals had suffered greatly from attacks from the more numerous Visigothic federates, and not long after taking power, Gaiseric decided to leave Hispania to this rival Germanic tribe. In fact, he seems to have started building a Vandal fleet even before he became king. In 429 Gaiseric was attacked by a large force of Suebi under the command of Heremigarius who had managed to take Lusitania. This Suebic army was defeated near Mérida and its leader drowned in the Guadiana River while trying to flee.

Africa
Succeeding his brother Gunderic at a time when the Vandals were settled in Baetica, Roman Hispania (modern Andalusia, Spain), Gaiseric successfully defended himself against a Suebian attack and transported most of his people—possibly as many as 80,000 persons—to Northern Africa in 428/429. Some scholars claim that this figure represents an exaggeration and the number was probably closer to 20,000. Whatever the true numbers, there are indications that the Vandals under Gaiseric may have been invited by the Roman governor Bonifacius, who wished to use the military strength of the Vandals in his struggle against the imperial government under the Roman general, Aetius.

Crossing at the Straits of Gibraltar, Gaiseric led not only his Vandal brethren and army, but was likely accompanied by a contingent of Alans and Goths. Once there, he won many battles over the weak and divided Roman defenders and quickly overran the territory now comprising modern Morocco and northern Algeria. His Vandal army laid siege to the city of Hippo Regius (where Augustine had recently been bishop and who died during the siege), taking it after 14 months of bitter fighting. Gaiseric and his forces then began subduing the interior of Numidia. A peace between Gaiseric and the Roman Emperor Valentinian III was concluded in 435, and in return for recognizing Gaiseric as king of the lands he had conquered, the Vandals would desist from further attacks on Carthage, pay a tribute to the Empire, and Gaiseric's son Huneric was sent—as a hostage—to Rome. Gaiseric's treaty with the Romans also included Vandal retention of Mauretania and part of Numidia as foederati (allies under special treaty) of Rome. 
 
In a surprise move on 19 October 439, Gaiseric captured Carthage, striking a devastating blow at imperial power, taking advantage of the fact that Aetius remained preoccupied with affairs in Gaul. Classical scholar Stewart Oost observed, "Thus he undoubtedly achieved what had been his purpose since he first crossed to Africa." Historian Chris Wickham argues that Gaiseric's conquest of Carthage presaged Rome's later collapse. The Romans were caught unaware, and Gaiseric captured a large part of the western Roman navy docked in the port of Carthage. The Catholic bishop of the city, Quodvultdeus, was exiled to Naples, since Gaiseric demanded that all his close advisors follow the Arian form of Christianity. The subsequent sermons of Quodvultdeus paint a "dark picture of the Vandal plunderers."

Despite the blow to the imperial coffers caused by Gaiseric's seizure of African revenue and the corresponding grain supply, the Vandal king had no intention of depriving Italy of Africa's grain, but instead wished to sell it to the emperor for profit. Meanwhile, his new status was that of Proconsularis and as such, Gaiseric made Carthage his new residence. Inheriting an already economically efficient and effective state, the tax revenues from his new lands enabled the Vandal conqueror to construct a large fleet that challenged imperial control over the Mediterranean. Gaiseric presided over a mixture of Vandals, Alans, Goths and Romans in Africa, relying on an ad-hoc administration under auspices of the imperial government to legitimize his rule. Latin literary culture even flourished in Carthage.

Gaiseric besieged Panormus (Palermo, Sicily) in 440 AD but was repulsed. Hunnic invasions into the lower Danube forced Constantinople to withdraw forces from Sicily to the benefit of Gaiseric. In a 442 treaty with Rome, the Vandals were recognized as the independent rulers of Byzacena and part of Numidia. In 455, Gaiseric seized the Balearic Islands, Sardinia, Corsica, and Malta, and his fleet soon came to control much of the western Mediterranean. During 455, the Roman emperor Valentinian III was murdered on orders of Petronius Maximus, who usurped the throne. Petronius Maximus also married Valentinian's widow, Licinia Eudoxia, and likewise wedded the imperial couple's daughter Eudocia to his own son; the latter had formerly been promised to Gaiseric's son, Huneric, which contributed a possible casus belli that was exploited by the Vandal king. Gaiseric was of the opinion that these acts voided his 442 peace treaty with Valentinian, and on 31 May, he and his men landed on Italian soil.

Sack of Rome

Responding to the actions of Petronius Maximus, Gaiseric moved a large seaborne force from Carthage to Italy and sacked the city in a more thorough manner than even Alaric's Goths had carried out in 410. Historian Michael Kulikowski notes that unlike Alaric, who besieged Rome as an itinerant barbarian general in "desperate straits," Gaiseric was the king of a flourishing polity and was therefore able to systematically conduct the sack. More than just systematically attack Rome, Gaiseric's invasion was a devastating blow to the empire itself, so much so that historian Michael Grant claims, "Gaiseric contributed more to the collapse of the western Roman Empire than any other single man."

Before Gaiseric marched upon Rome, Pope Leo I implored him not to destroy the ancient city or murder its inhabitants. Gaiseric agreed and the gates of Rome were thrown open to him and his men. Once inside the city, the invaders plundered it thoroughly, to the extent that Procopius noted how the Vandals had even stripped the gold from the ceiling of the Jupiter Capitolinus temple—but more significant was the capture of important figures and dignitaries in the city, whose return remained a bargaining point between the Vandals and the Empire for many years to come. Routine Vandal raids along the coast of Italy and the Mediterranean characterized the situation during the first years after Gaiseric's successful seizure of Rome.

Petronius Maximus, who was foremost among those vying for power in the wake of Valentinian III's murder, fled rather than fight the Vandal warlord. Although history remembers the Vandal sack of Rome as extremely brutal—making the word vandalism a term for any wantonly destructive act—in actuality, the Vandals did not wreak great destruction in the city; they did, however, take gold, silver and many other things of value. Gaiseric also took with him Empress Eudoxia and her daughters, Eudocia, and Placidia, as well as riches from the city. Across Italy, the shock of the Vandal sack of Rome and the ongoing presence of the Vandals paralyzed the imperial government. Eudocia married Gaiseric's son Huneric after arriving in Carthage. That union produced Hilderic—Gaiseric's grandson—who later played a critical role in Emperor Justinian's sixth-century conquests of north Africa.

Later exploits and final years

Sometime in 460, the Emperor Majorian began collecting an invasion fleet for an assault against the Vandals. Once Gaiseric received word of this initiative, he preempted the attack by sending vessels from Carthage to Carthago Nova, where the Vandal ships burned the imperial boats at their moorings, again proving himself "more than a match for the imperial establishments of both West and East." Then in early 462, Gaiseric sent the empress Eudoxia with her daughters Eudocia and Placidia—captured during the sack of Rome—back to Constantinople from Carthage in an act of reconciliation with the Empire, likely intending to preserve the marriage of his son Huneric to Eudocia.

While rhetorical writing from the period still distinguished between "barbarian" and Romans and the imperial state attempted to exercise control over the empire and its peripheries, the elite population in the lands controlled by the likes of the Germanic chieftains Theodoric and Gaiseric, preferred the certainties of their leadership over "the vagaries and ineptitude of the would-be imperial government in Italy."

In 468, Gaiseric's kingdom was the target of the last concerted effort by the two-halves of the Roman Empire. They wished to subdue the Vandals and end their pirate raids, so Emperor Leo sent an armada from Constantinople led by Basiliscus. Gaiseric sent a fleet of 500 Vandal ships against the Romans, losing 340 ships in the first engagement, but succeeded in destroying 600 Roman ships in the second battle, during which fireships were employed by Gaiseric to devastating effect. This catastrophic defeat of the Roman fleet by Gaiseric's forces was claimed to have cost the imperial coffers upwards of 64,000 pounds of gold and 700,000 pounds of silver. The Romans abandoned the campaign and Gaiseric remained master of the western Mediterranean until his death, ruling from the Strait of Gibraltar all the way to Tripolitania.

Following up the Byzantine defeat, the Vandals tried to invade the Peloponnese but were driven back by the Maniots at Kenipolis with heavy losses. In retaliation, the Vandals took 500 hostages at Zakynthos, hacked them to pieces, and threw the body parts overboard on the way to Carthage.

In 474, Gaiseric made peace with the Eastern Roman Empire through a treaty negotiated by the Constantinopolitan Senator, Severus, who was acting under Zeno's authority. After enjoying just a few short years of peace, Gaiseric died at Carthage in 477, succeeded by his son Huneric, who did not have his father's enviable reputation and Vandal authority began to diminish. Nonetheless, the peace established by Zeno between Vandal-controlled Carthage and Constantinople lasted until 530, when Justinian's conquests broke it.

See also
 Alaric I
 Augustine: The Decline of the Roman Empire.
 Barbarians Rising
 Battle of Agrigentum (456)
 Odoacer

References

Notes

Citations

Bibliography

Further reading

389 births
477 deaths
Year of birth uncertain
Kings of the Vandals
Vandal warriors
Mauretania
Africa (Roman province)
5th-century Arian Christians
5th-century monarchs in Africa
5th-century monarchs in Europe
5th century in the Byzantine Empire